Radio Quarantine or Radio Quarantine Kolkata (abbreviated as RQK) is an Indian internet based community radio and podcast. It was founded on 25 March 2020 by a group of professors, directors and PhD students in response to social isolation protocols imposed as a result of the COVID-19 pandemic. 

It also refers to The Radio Quarantine, which was a Bangalore-based internet community radio launched a day later on 26 March and operated by a network of independent composers and instrument makers.

History

Radio Quarantine Kolkata 
Radio Quarantine was launched on 25 March 2020 in the city of Kolkata, West Bengal. It was founded by a group of professors, directors and PhD students in response to social isolation protocols following the outbreak of the COVID-19 pandemic in India. The group was formed after the Government of West Bengal had announced that a lockdown in the state was to be imposed and its launch coincided with the sudden imposition of the national lockdown by the Prime Minister Narendra Modi, which had been ordered a day before on 24 March. The station began operation as a community radio run from studio setups at homes with 10 administrators for technical and editorial oversight.

The broadcast were hosted on the free of cost radio streaming platform ZenoRadio, and went live from 4 pm onwards on 25 March. The inaugural programme on the station was a 30-minute reading session by Sujaan Mukherjee, a researcher on the urban history of Kolkata at the Jadavpur University. The station begun as a 24/7 service with a mixture of pre-recorded original programmes and repeat programmes at other times, gathering around 5,000 listeners within the first 9 days of its launch.

On May Day, the station held a collaboration with the Udichi Shilpi Goshti, the largest cultural organisation in Bangladesh and hosted a show featuring revolutionary songs and commemorated the 1886 Haymarket massacre by chronicling its history. It featured a show with a series of interviews on women workers from West Bengal and Bangladesh. The first half of the show included interviews with domestic workers from West Bengal who described their loss of livelihood due lack of regulations or an labour union to represent them in midst of the COVID-19 pandemic, while the second half of the show featured an interview with Taslima Akhter, the president of a Bangladeshi solidarity group for garment workers, who spoke about their exploitation and how the pandemic had made situation worse by forcing workers to either starve or risk infection.

According to Kasturi Basu, one of the administrators, the idea for collaborating with Bangladeshi individuals on May Day had come about during their planning of shows for the birth anniversary of Rabindranath Tagore on 7 May 2020. Basu states that the decision was taken "because Bangladesh fought for their right to celebrate Tagore's body of work, which was accused of hosting anti-Islamic values". The station aired the show called Bangladesher Hriday Hote that featured interviews with individuals like the novelist Azizul Huq, biographer Jatin Sarkar, sociologist Anupam Sen and Moinul Abedin, the son of Zainul Abedin who had chronicled the 1943 Bengal famine through his paintings. On 19 May 2020, the station also hosted programmes narrating and discussing the Bengali Language Movement in the Barak Valley of Assam.

The station organised a memorial on 20 May 2020 to commemorate the death of the Bengali journalist and freedom fighter Kamal Lohani who was the founder of the Free Bengal Radio Station and had died of COVID-19. It stopped airing shows for a few weeks following the landfall of Cyclone Amphan and resumed streaming after electricity and connectivity were restored in Kolkata. The radio station produced over 350 episodes by the end of August and gathered an international audience. The relaxation of the lockdown led to fewer original programming being broadcast by the station and by September, it had begun producing original programming in the form of podcasts with monthly six to ten episodes.

The Radio Quarantine 
The Radio Quarantine was launched in the city of Bangalore, Karnataka on 26 March 2020, a day after the launch of Radio Quarantine Kolkata and was operated by a network of independent composers and instrument makers called the Indian Sonic Research Organisation. It went live every night from 9 p.m. onwards and its programmes were primarily run by the musician Yashas Shetty, one of the members of the network. The radio was hosted on the website radio.artscienceblr.org and operated out of Shetty's residence in Benson Town, Bangalore. Within the first 21 days, the station had attracted a significant audience of listeners both locally and internationally.

The station broadcast music on episodes with specific lockdown related themes such as Isolation, Taking a Break, Dancing on Your Own, etc and hosted discussion shows about ongoing political and social issues in India. The songs featured on the station including a wide rage of genres and time periods, and were compared with those on Radio Quarantine Kolkata in terms of their eclecticism. The genres included both eastern and western classical compositions, contemporary Japanese musicians and Hindi and English pop from the 1980s. The station also accepted song requests and listeners were encouraged to make submissions.

The political ecologist Savita Vijayakumar had collaborated with the station and arranged invitations for a number of guest speakers on its discussion shows, which were hosted by Shetty. The shows have featured discussions on the dangers posed by science with the cosmologist Martin Rees, on the crisis faced by migrants and other workers in midst of the pandemic with the activist and unionist Kavita Krishnan, and on various other topics with individuals such as the sound engineer Umashankar Mantravadi and writer Arshia Sattar, among others.

Format and shows 
Radio Quarantine Kolkata is a 24x7 live internet radio hosted on ZenoFM and broadcasts a wide range of music from its collection. The radio broadcasts segments with interviews and news bulletins. The target audience consists of Bengalis including its international diaspora, attracting listeners from places like London and the United States.

During the pandemic, the station ran various programs and episodes throughout the day, featuring original programmes between 5pm and 2am. Its daily shows ended with a music segment hosted by the writer Sudipto Sanyal called Songs of Comfort for Hypochondriac and Pining Lovers, which featured an eclectic collection of Indian and International songs and continued till 2am at night. Sanyal who goes by the pseudo name RJ Bishakto Chochchori continues to host the music segment every Saturday from around midnight onwards. The segment includes and has included music from Brazilian rock, Venezuelan folk, Bollywood songs, Palestinian reggae, Japanese pop, Habibi funk, Vietnamese hip hop and American jazz and hip hop, among others. The show has a focus on a variety of music from Brazil and Sanyal describes it as a place for "football, jazz, music and resistance". 

One of the popular segments of the station was Quarantine Diaries, which featured a daily news summary and included analysis of the controversial Citizenship Amendment Act and the associated National Register of Citizens amid the pandemic. Darshan Mitra, a professor at the National Institute of Juridicial Science is associated with the segment. The singer and oral historian Moushumi Bhowmik hosted a segment, which documented regional and cultural histories across Bengal including those from Purulia to Sylhet to the Sundarbans and occasionally featured interviews with various folk singers. Kankan Bhattacharyya hosted a show called Asamayer Katha, Samayer Gaan. It also included shows related to health advice which feature medical professionals. 

The station also broadcasts reading sessions through home recordings from participants including monologues, poetry and short story readings and had a children's segment. Recorded performances were crowdsourced from listener contributors, that were aired based on a specified criterion set by the station for the day's segment and included experiences of individuals isolated in their homes. Some of these were gathered from minors and were aired on the children's segment. The children's segment was allotted an hour slot, which was occasionally hosted by a teacher based in the country of Norway. It involved short stories readings, poem recitals and music.

Around September 2020, new original programmes were shifted to a podcast featuring six to ten episodes per month. The episodes focus on educational content related to science and technology in simplified language for the understanding of untrained adults and children. It also consists of episodes related to political, social and philosophical questions, including episodes on The Plague by Albert Camus, on Plague and Quarantine by Rajinder Singh Bedi and on Shada Prithibi  by Sharadindu Bandyopadhyay.

The original programmes from the radio and the podcast are hosted on and archived across platforms such as YouTube, Spotify, Audacity, etc.

References

External links 
 
 

Educational podcasts
Radio stations in Bangalore
Radio stations in Kolkata
2020 podcast debuts